In topological graph theory, a graph-encoded map or gem is a method of encoding a cellular embedding of a graph using a different graph with four vertices per edge of the original graph. It is the topological analogue of runcination, a geometric operation on polyhedra.
Alternative and equivalent systems for representing cellular embeddings include signed rotation systems and ribbon graphs.

If  is a flag,
The three colors of edges in  represent each of these three types of flags that differ by one of their three elements. However, interpreting a graph-encoded map in this way requires more care. When the same face appears on both sides of an edge, as can happen for instance for a planar embedding of a tree, the two sides give rise to different gem vertices. And when the same vertex appears at both endpoints of a self-loop, the two ends of the edge again give rise to different gem vertices. In this way, each triple  may be associated with up to four different vertices of the gem.

Whenever a cubic graph  can be 3-edge-colored so that the red-blue cycles of the coloring all have length four, the colored graph can be interpreted as a graph-encoded map, and represents an embedding of another graph .

The dual graph of a graph-encoded map may be obtained from the map by recoloring it so that the red edges of the gem become blue and the blue edges become red.

References

Topological graph theory